Dominik Mareš (born 3 February 2003) is a Czech professional footballer who plays as a midfielder for Pardubice.

Career
On 10 April 2022, Mareš made his debut for Pardubice, after graduating from the club's academy, in a 4–0 loss against Slavia Prague.

Personal life
Mareš' father, Pavel, is a former Czech Republic international. He has two younger sisters, Linda (16) and Vivien (12).

References

2003 births
Living people
Czech footballers
Association football midfielders
FK Pardubice players
Czech First League players